The Seven Year Itch may refer to:

Psychology and health
The seven-year itch, a term that suggests that happiness declines after around year seven after a marriage
Scabies or seven year itch, a parasitic skin infection

Theater and film 

 The Seven Year Itch (play), a 1952 play by George Axelrod, originally starring Tom Ewell and Vanessa Brown
 The Seven Year Itch, a 1955 film by Billy Wilder, based on the play, and starring Marilyn Monroe and Tom Ewell
 Seven Years Itch, a 1987 Hong Kong film directed by Johnnie To

Music

Albums
 Seven Year Itch: 1982–1989, a 1999 compilation album by Platinum Blonde
 Seven Year Itch (Collective Soul album), a 2001 album by Collective Soul
 The Seven Year Itch (Angelica album), 2002
 The Seven Year Itch (Siouxsie and the Banshees album), 2003
 Seven Year Itch (Etta James album), 1988

Other 

 "The Seven Year Itch" (Grimm), a season 6 episode of the television series Grimm
 Shooting star press or the Seven-Year Itch, a professional wrestling maneuver